The twelfth season of the talent show The Voice of Germany premiered on 18 August 2022. The show was broadcast by two local TV stations, ProSieben and Sat.1, during the Blind Auditions and the Battles. The rest episodes of the season were broadcast by Sat.1 only.

Mark Forster returned for his sixth season. Rea Garvey and Stefanie Kloß, who last appeared on season 10, returned as coaches for their seventh and fourth seasons respectively, replacing Johannes Oerding and Sarah Connor. Peter Maffay joined the show as a new coach this season, replacing Nico Santos. Meanwhile, Thore Schölermann returned for his eleventh season as host, with Melissa Khalaj replacing Lena Gercke as the new host.

Anny Ogrezeanu was named The Voice of Germany on November 4, 2022. This marked Mark Forster's first win on the main show after being a coach for six seasons, and his third in the entire series (twice on the Kids' version).

Panelists

Coaches

On 13 April 2022, ProSieben and Sat.1 announced Mark Forster would be the only coach returning, meaning that Nico Santos, Johannes Oerding and Sarah Connor would not be returning as coaches for season 12. On 12 May 2022, it was announced that Rea Garvey and Stefanie Kloss would be returning as solo coaches after a one-year hiatus, along with new coach Peter Maffay. After three seasons, the Comeback Stage by SEAT was not reinstated this season, leading to the departure of last season's Comeback Stage coach Elif Demirezer. Hence, the number of finalists on the show would be down to four once again.

Hosts 
On 30 March 2022, Lena Gercke announced on her Instagram account that after seven seasons she would not be returning to the show. On 21 April 2022, it was announced that Thore Schölermann would return as host and Melissa Khalaj would be the new host.

Teams

Blind Auditions
The Blind Auditions were recorded from 19 May 2022 to 24 May 2022 at Studio Adlershof in Berlin and began broadcasting 18 August 2022, being broadcast every Thursday on ProSieben and every Friday on Sat.1.

In this round, the four coaches can press their buttons and select however number of artists they want to join their teams. A total of 119 artists auditioned and 75 of them got at least one coach turned for their performance. In addition, 26 artists got a four-chair-turn in this round.

Battles
The Battles were recorded from July 4, 2022 to July 6, 2022 in Berlin, being broadcast like the Blind Auditions every Thursday on ProSieben and every Friday on Sat.1.

In this round, the four coaches pair two or three of their artists, depending on the total number of artists on their teams, in a singing match and then select one of them to advance to the next round. Each coach has only one 'Steal' which can be used to select an artist on another team and lost the battle to advance to the Sing-offs.

Sing-offs
The Sing-offs were recorded in Berlin from July 19, 2022 to July 20, 2022 and were broadcast only by Sat.1 on Friday nights.

In this round, each coach divides their ten candidates into three groups, in which each participant performs a song in turn. The coach then chooses one participant from each group to move on to the Semi-final, where all four coaches each have three candidates left on their team.

Last season marked the first time that the show did not invite mentors since the sixth season. However, in the Sing-offs this season the advisors were again introduced by the show. Rea Garvey's candidates were supported by Tones and I, Stefanie Kloß' candidates by Lena, Peter Maffay's candidates by Wincent Weiss and Mark Forster's candidates by Calum Scott.

Semi-final 
The Semi-final aired on October 28, 2022. Twelve contestants, three per coach, competed in this round and only one from each team advanced to the season Finale. Since there is no Comeback Stage, unlike in the previous three seasons, no fifth finalist was added. Also, the show canceled the quarter-final this season.

In this round, the coaches are not the ones to decide who moves on to the next round. Instead, it is the audiences who vote determine which contestants from the teams advance to the Finale. Tammo Förster, Julian Pförtner, Basti Schmidt, and Anny Ogrezeanu are the four finalists. Anny is also the only finalist that didn't get a four-chair-turn in the Blind Auditions.

Sophie Frei was initially announced to move onto the finale for Team Rea, before it was revealed that a technical error mixed Frei's and Tammo Förster's percentages on the on-screen graphic. This was verified minutes later when a notary came on stage to confirm the results. The voting results of Jan Bleeker were not affected by the glitch.

The coaches kicked off the Semi-final with "Are You Gonna Go My Way" by Lenny Kravitz. The show also invited Michael Schulte and Max Giesinger, who ended up in third and fourth place on the first season of The Voice of Germany and both started a career since then, as guests to perform their latest single "More to This Life".

Finale 
The Finale aired on November 4, 2022. Due to the cancellation of the Comeback Stage, only four finalists competed in the Finale. In the Finale, each artist first performed a duet with their own coach and then another with a guest artist.

The show invited famous singer-songwriters including Brit-nominated Calum Scott, former coach Nico Santos, Eurovision Song Contest 2014 winner Conchita Wurst, and a band Alphaville. Last season's winner Sebastien Krenz joined the finalists (Tammo Förster, Julian Pförtner, Basti Schmidt, and Anny Ogrezeanu) to perform his latest single and Zoe Wees who was a contestant on the fifth season of The Voice Kids also joined the show as a guest.

Particularly, right before the announcement of the final result, Iranian-American singer Rana Mansour performed the English version of "Baraye" by Shervin Hajipour. This song serves as the anthem of the ongoing 2021-2022 Iranian Protests, which escalated again a few days before the broadcasting day of the Finale. It calls for peace and women's rights in Iran.

Anny Ogrezeanu is crowned the winner of this season, marking Mark Forster's first win after being a coach on the show for six seasons and the third in the series (twice on the Kids' version). This also means that Anny Ogrezeanu, as the only finalist who has not received a 'four-chair-turn' in the Blind Auditions this season, is also the only non-'four-chair-turn' winner since season 8, where a two-chair-turn contestant Samuel Rösch won the show representing coach Michael Patrick Kelly.

Elimination Chart
Coaches color key

Results color key

Episode Summary & Ratings

References

External links
 Official website
 The Voice of Germany on fernsehserien.de

12
2022 German television seasons